Micael Duarte Isidoro (born 12 August 1982) is a Portuguese road cyclist, who currently rides for UCI Continental team .

Major results
2003
 1st Stage 4 Volta a Portugal do Futuro
2004
 3rd Gran Premio Città di Empoli
2008
 2nd Overall Tour of South China Sea
1st Stage 8
2011
 1st Stage 2 Vuelta a Zamora
 1st Stage 1 Volta ás Comarcas de Lugo
 7th Road race, National Road Championships
2012
 1st Stages 1a (TTT) & 1b Volta ás Comarcas de Lugo
 8th Road race, National Road Championships

References

External links

1982 births
Living people
Portuguese male cyclists
People from Cadaval
Sportspeople from Lisbon District